Joan Uduak Ekah (born 16 December 1980 in Kaduna) is a retired Nigerian athlete specializing in the sprinting events. She competed in the 100 metres at the 2000 Summer Olympics reaching the second round.

With 7.09 she was the world junior record holder in the indoor 60 metres between 1999 and 2016 when the record was lowered to 7.07 by Ewa Swoboda.

Competition record

Personal bests
Outdoor
100 metres – 11.11 (+1.1 m/s) (Lausanne 1999)
200 metres – 23.27 (-0.5 m/s) (Dijon 2000)

Indoor
60 metres – 7.09 (Maebashi 1999)
200 metres – 24.10 (Valencia 1999)

References

External links

1980 births
Living people
Nigerian female sprinters
Athletes (track and field) at the 2000 Summer Olympics
Olympic athletes of Nigeria
Athletes (track and field) at the 2002 Commonwealth Games
Commonwealth Games competitors for Nigeria
Sportspeople from Kaduna
Athletes (track and field) at the 1999 All-Africa Games
Athletes (track and field) at the 2003 All-Africa Games
African Games competitors for Nigeria
Olympic female sprinters
21st-century Nigerian women